Elections for the Michigan Senate was held on Tuesday, November 4, 2014, with partisan primary elections to select the party's nominees held on August 5. All 38 seats in the Michigan Senate were contested, and those elected will serve in the 98th and 99th Michigan Legislatures. This was the first election for the Michigan Senate contested under the constituency boundaries drawn in consequence of the 2010 U.S. Census. The election resulted in the Republicans expanding their majority to 27 seats over the Democrats 11 seats.

Members not seeking re-election
State Senators are only allowed to serve 2 four-year terms, a maximum of 8 years. The following Senators were not running for a new term in 2014.

Results
Due to the redistricting done as a result of the 2010 U.S. Census, there were consolidation of districts that resulted in a "new" 26th District to be created. The new 26th District was a won by the Republicans, causing a gain for Republicans as consolidation effectively resulted in two Democratic held districts being merged. A recount in the 20th District resulted in Margaret O'Brien's win widening from 59 votes to 61 votes. The election resulted in the Republicans expanding their majority to 27 seats over the Democrats 11 seats.

Shortly after the election, Arlan Meekhof, Republican from the 30th District, was elected Senate Majority Leader, Mike Kowall, Republican from the 15th District, was elected Senate Majority Floor Leader, Jim Ananich, Democrat from the 27th District, was elected Senate Minority Leader, and Morris Hood III, Democrat from the 3rd District, was elected Senate Minority Floor Leader.

District 1-9

Districts 10-19

Districts 20-29

Districts 30-38

Maps

Special election
On November 8, 2016, a special election was held in the 4th District to fill the vacancy left when Virgil Smith Jr. resigned.

See also
Michigan House of Representatives election, 2014

References

2014 Michigan elections
Michigan Senate elections
Michigan Senate
November 2014 events in the United States